Mitbach  is a river of North Rhine-Westphalia, Germany. It flows into the Veybach in Euskirchen.

See also
List of rivers of North Rhine-Westphalia

References

Rivers of North Rhine-Westphalia
Rivers of the Eifel
Rivers of Germany